Dakota Block may refer to:
 Dakota Block (Grand Forks, North Dakota), a historic commercial building
 Dakota Block, a character in the 2007 film Grindhouse 
 Dakota Block, a character in the 2014 TV series From Dusk till Dawn: The Series